FFC Brauweiler Pulheim 2000 was a German women's football club based in Pulheim, North Rhine-Westphalia. It was founded when the women's section of Grün-Weiß Brauweiler in 2000 established its own club. The team played its last season in the Regionalliga, the German third division. Afterwards the clubs disbanded to join 1. FC Köln.

History 

In 1974 Thomas Meyer established a training group which became the women's section of Grün-Weiß Brauweiler. The team played in the top division from the beginning on and relegations in 1980 and 1986 were followed by direct re-promotions. Despite three consecutive wins of the regional Mittelrheinpokal in 1989-91 Brauweiler did not qualify for the Bundesliga at its inception in 1990. The following season marked one of the club's greatest successes as promotion to the Bundesliga was achieved. Brauweiler won the cup in the same season, being still the only time a club from the second division was able to achieve this feat. The club fought its way to the Bundesliga final, there losing to TSV Siegen. After winning another cup in 1993 and several second places in the league Brauweiler won its first and only championship in 1997. A week later the club's third cup win completed the Double.

With a fourth place in 1997–98 Brauweiler qualified for the single-railed Bundesliga, but several seasons of mediocre performance followed. Eventually the team was relegated to the 2nd league in 2003–04. A direct re-promotion was followed by a year of constant fighting against being relegated yet again. The retirement of several core players led to a disastrous 2006–07 season where Brauweiler took loss after loss, resulting in relegation without having won a single point. The second consecutive relegation followed right away in a season that also brought financial turmoil for Brauweiler, leaving the team to play in the third division for the first time. In 2008–09 Brauweiler won the championship in the Regionalliga thus qualifying for the 2nd league once again. The club disbanded before the 2009–10 season to join 1. FC Köln, though.

Honours
 German football champions: 1997
 Regionalliga champions: 2009
 DFB-Pokal: 1991, 1994, 1997
 Super-Cup: 1994, 1997

Notable past players

 Sonja Fuss
 Maren Meinert
 Silke Rottenberg
 Tina Theune-Meyer
 Bettina Wiegmann
 Esmeralda Negron

Statistics

References

External links
Official website

Defunct women's football clubs in Germany
Defunct football clubs in North Rhine-Westphalia
Football clubs in Cologne
Association football clubs established in 2000
Association football clubs disestablished in 2009
2000 establishments in Germany
2009 disestablishments in Germany
Frauen-Bundesliga clubs